Alker is a surname. Notable people with the surname include:

Doug Alker (born 1940), British writer and deaf activist
Hayward Alker (1937–2007), American academic and writer
Hermann Alker (1885–1967), German architect
Imre Alker (born 1941), Hungarian wrestler 
John Alker (fl. 1797–1832), English clockmaker
Malcolm Alker (born 1978), English rugby league player
Steve Alker (born 1964), Welsh darts player
Steven Alker (born 1971), New Zealand golfer